Sir Edmund Morgan was a Welsh politician who sat in the House of Commons  in 1601 and 1621.

Morgan was the second  son of Henry Morgan of Llandaff and Penllwyn-Sarth. He was a captain in the army and was knighted probably at Dublin on 5 August 1599.

In 1601, Morgan was elected Member of Parliament for Wilton. He was High Sheriff of Monmouthshire in 1602. In 1621 he was elected MP for Monmouthshire.

Morgan married a daughter of Mr Francis in around 1600. He was the brother of  Henry Morgan of Llandaff, also MP for Monmouthshire.

References

 

Year of birth missing
Year of death missing
People from Llandaff
High Sheriffs of Monmouthshire
English MPs 1601
English MPs 1621–1622